The 1931 Oregon State Beavers football team represented Oregon State University in the Pacific Coast Conference (PCC) during the 1931 college football season.  In their eighth season under head coach Paul J. Schissler, the Beavers compiled a 6–3–1 record (1–3–1 against PCC opponents), finished in seventh place in the PCC, and outscored their opponents, 198 to 62.  Under coach Schissler, from 1925 to 1932, no team captains were elected.  The team played its home games at Bell Field in Corvallis, Oregon.

Schedule

References

Oregon State
Oregon State Beavers football seasons
Oregon State Beavers football